Bion is an opera by the French composer Étienne Méhul. It takes the form of a comédie en vers mêlée de musique (an opéra comique) in one act. It premiered at the Opéra-Comique in Paris on 27 December 1800. The libretto, by François-Benoît Hoffman, is based on Les voyages d'Anténor by Étienne-François de Lantier. The opera was revived on 15 November 1802.

Roles

Synopsis

Scene: the island of Salamis

The middle-aged poet Bion is the guardian of young Nysa whom he has freed from slavery. He welcomes the travellers Cratès and Agénor, a young philosopher and pupil of Plato, as guests in his house. Agénor and Nysa fall in love, although Nysa does so reluctantly as she believes she owes a debt of gratitude to Bion. Bion pretends to go on a journey, saying he plans to marry Nysa on his return. During his absence, Nysa and Agénor declare their love for one another and decide to marry. Bion suddenly reappears leading a child disguised as Cupid and interrupts the wedding ceremony. He teases Agénor by pretending that the celebrations are for his marriage to Nysa. Agénor, overcome with shame at betraying Bion's hospitality, prepares to leave, but Bion tells the young couple he has known of their love all along and has engineered events to test them. He gives his blessing to their marriage.

Recordings
The overture appears on: Méhul Overtures, Orchestre de Bretagne, conducted by Stefan Sanderling (ASV, 2002).

References

Sources
 Arthur Pougin Méhul: sa vie, son génie, son caractère (Fischbacher, 1889)
 General introduction to Méhul's operas in the  introduction to the edition of Stratonice by M. Elizabeth C. Bartlet (Pendragon Press, 1997)
 Nicole Wild and David Charlton, Théâtre de l'Opéra-Comique Paris: Répertoire 1762-1972 (Mardaga, 2005)

Operas by Étienne Méhul
1800 operas
Opéras comiques
French-language operas
One-act operas
Operas
Opera world premieres at the Opéra-Comique